"You Can't Count On Me" is the second single and lead commercial single released by Counting Crows from their album Saturday Nights & Sunday Mornings.

Critical reception
Billboard magazine gave the single three-and-a-half stars, calling it "a pleasant surprise" and saying "Duritz's vocals are still more whiny than soulful, but he can deliver a lyrical twist like he's holding an ice pick."

"You Can't Count On Me," was released to radio stations on February 4, 2008. A music video for the song was released on March 20, 2008. To promote the album, the band performed on Private Sessions, Good Morning America, Late Show with David Letterman, The View and The Late Late Show with Craig Ferguson.

Frontman Adam Duritz has stated in concert that the song is about "people mistaking you for a dependable guy".

Charts

References

2008 singles
Counting Crows songs
2008 songs
Geffen Records singles
Song recordings produced by Brian Deck
Songs written by Adam Duritz
Songs written by Dan Vickrey
Songs written by David Bryson
Songs written by Charlie Gillingham
American rock songs